Fréscano is a municipality of province of Zaragoza, Aragon, Spain. It is located near the Huecha River, a tributary of the Ebro. According to the 2010 census the municipality has a population of 220 inhabitants. Its postal code is 50562.

History
Burrén and Burrena are two 413 and 397 m high breast-shaped hills located between Fréscano and Mallén, where there is an ancient Iron Age Urnfield culture archaeological site.

Gallery

See also
Campo de Borja
List of municipalities in Zaragoza

References

External links 

 Fréscano, CAI Aragon
Yacimiento arqueológico de Burrén
Burrén y Burrena, las "dos teticas" con historia en Fréscano

Municipalities in the Province of Zaragoza
Campo de Borja